This is an incomplete list of Statutory Rules of Northern Ireland in 1998.

1-100

 Social Security (Miscellaneous Amendments) Regulations (Northern Ireland) 1998 (S.R. 1998 No. 2))
 Social Fund Winter Fuel Payment Regulations (Northern Ireland) 1998 (S.R. 1998 No. 3)
 Race Relations (Prescribed Public Bodies) Regulations (Northern Ireland) 1998 (S.R. 1998 No. 4)
 Criminal Justice (Serious Fraud) (Northern Ireland) Order 1988 (Notice of Transfer) (Amendment) Regulations 1998 (S.R. 1998 No. 6)
 Children's Evidence (Northern Ireland) Order 1995 (Notice of Transfer) (Amendment) Regulations 1998 (S.R. 1998 No. 7)
 Child Support (Miscellaneous Amendments) Regulations (Northern Ireland) 1998 (S.R. 1998 No. 8)
 General Medical Services (Amendment) Regulations (Northern Ireland) 1998 (S.R. 1998 No. 9)
 Jobseeker's Allowance (Amendment) Regulations (Northern Ireland) 1998 (S.R. 1998 No. 10)
 Education (Pupil Records) Regulations (Northern Ireland) 1998 (S.R. 1998 No. 11)
 Education (Individual Pupils' Achievements) (Information) Regulations (Northern Ireland) 1998 (S.R. 1998 No. 12)
 Medical Practitioners (Vocational Training) Regulations (Northern Ireland) 1998 (S.R. 1998 No. 13)
 Plant Health (Amendment) Order (Northern Ireland) 1998 (S.R. 1998 No. 16)
 Registered Rents (Increase) Order (Northern Ireland) 1998 (S.R. 1998 No. 17)
 Street Works (Qualifications of Supervisors and Operatives) Regulations (Northern Ireland) 1998 (S.R. 1998 No. 20)
 County Court (Amendment) Rules (Northern Ireland) 1998 (S.R. 1998 No. 21)
 Education (Student Loans) (Amendment) Regulations (Northern Ireland) 1998 (S.R. 1998 No. 22)
 Food Protection (Emergency Prohibitions) (Amendment) Order (Northern Ireland) 1998 (S.R. 1998 No. 23)
 Bread and Flour Regulations (Northern Ireland) 1998 (S.R. 1998 No. 24)
 Carrickfergus Harbour Order (Northern Ireland) 1998 (S.R. 1998 No. 25)
 Cattle Identification (Enforcement) Regulations (Northern Ireland) 1998 (S.R. 1998 No. 27)
 Industrial Pollution Control (Prescribed Processes and Substances) Regulations (Northern Ireland) 1998 (S.R. 1998 No. 28)
 Industrial Pollution Control (Applications, Appeals and Registers) Regulations (Northern Ireland) 1998 (S.R. 1998 No. 29)
 Industrial Pollution Control (Authorisation of Processes) (Determination Periods) Order (Northern Ireland) 1998 (S.R. 1998 No. 30)
 Hill Livestock (Compensatory Allowances) (Amendment) Regulations (Northern Ireland) 1998 (S.R. 1998 No. 34)
 Social Security (Contributions and Industrial Injuries) (Canada) Order (Northern Ireland) 1998 (S.R. 1998 No. 39)
 Beef Carcass (Classification) (Amendment) Regulation (Northern Ireland) 1998 (S.R. 1998 No. 40)
 Local Government (Superannuation and Compensation) (Institutions of Further Education) Regulations (Northern Ireland) 1998 (S.R. 1998 No. 41)
 Northern Ireland Fishery Harbour Authority (Accounts) Regulations (Northern Ireland) 1998 (S.R. 1998 No. 42)
 Products of Animal Origin (Import and Export) Regulations (Northern Ireland) 1998 (S.R. 1998 No. 45)
 Conservation of Scallops (Amendment) Regulations (Northern Ireland) 1998 (S.R. 1998 No. 46)
 Offshore Noise and Electricity Regulations (Northern Ireland) 1998 (S.R. 1998 No. 47)
 Measuring Equipment (Capacity Measures) Regulations (Northern Ireland) 1998 (S.R. 1998 No. 48)
 Students Awards (Amendment) Regulations (Northern Ireland) 1998 (S.R. 1998 No. 50)
 Education (Student Loans) (1998 Order) (Commencement) Order (Northern Ireland) 1998 (S.R. 1998 No. 51)
 Guaranteed Minimum Pensions Increase Order (Northern Ireland) 1998 (S.R. 1998 No. 52)
 Industrial Pollution Control (1997 Order) (Commencement No. 1) Order (Northern Ireland) 1998 (S.R. 1998 No. 53)
 Social Security (Incapacity for Work) (General) (Amendment) Regulation (Northern Ireland) 1998 (S.R. 1998 No. 54)
 Spreadable Fats (Marketing Standards) (Amendment) Regulations (Northern Ireland) 1998 (S.R. 1998 No. 55)
 Gaming (Variation of Monetary Limits) Order (Northern Ireland) 1998 (S.R. 1998 No. 56)
 Gaming Machine (Prescribed Licensed Premises) Regulations (Northern Ireland) 1998 (S.R. 1998 No. 57)
 Education (Student Loans) Regulations (Northern Ireland) 1998 (S.R. 1998 No. 58)
 Social Security Benefits Up-rating Order (Northern Ireland) 1998 (S.R. 1998 No. 59)
 Rates (Regional Rates) Order (Northern Ireland) 1998 (S.R. 1998 No. 60)
 Social Security (Contributions) (Re-rating and Northern Ireland National Insurance Fund Payments) Order (Northern Ireland) 1998 (S.R. 1998 No. 61)
 Statutory Maternity Pay (Compensation of Employers) (Amendment) Regulations (Northern Ireland) 1998 (S.R. 1998 No. 62)
 Social Security Benefits Up-rating Regulations (Northern Ireland) 1998 (S.R. 1998 No. 63)
 Social Security (Industrial Injuries) (Dependency) (Permitted Earnings Limits) Order (Northern Ireland) 1998 (S.R. 1998 No. 64)
 Museums and Galleries (1998 Order) (Commencement) Order (Northern Ireland) 1998 (S.R. 1998 No. 65)
 Pensions Increase (Review) Order (Northern Ireland) 1998 (S.R. 1998 No. 66)
 Mines (Substances Hazardous to Health) Regulations (Northern Ireland) 1998 (S.R. 1998 No. 67)
 Courses for Drink-Drive Offenders (Designation of District) Order (Northern Ireland) 1998 (S.R. 1998 No. 68)
 Meat (Sterilisation and Staining) (Amendment) Regulations (Northern Ireland) 1998 (S.R. 1998 No. 69)
 Social Security (Contributions) (Re-rating) Consequential Amendment Regulations (Northern Ireland) 1998 (S.R. 1998 No. 71)
 Social Security (Contributions) (Amendment) Regulations (Northern Ireland) 1998 (S.R. 1998 No. 72)
 Housing Benefit (General) (Amendment) Regulations (Northern Ireland) 1998 (S.R. 1998 No. 73)
 Motor Vehicle Testing (Amendment) Regulations (Northern Ireland) 1998 (S.R. 1998 No. 74)
 Goods Vehicles (Testing) (Amendment) Regulations (Northern Ireland) 1998 (S.R. 1998 No. 75)
 Public Service Vehicles (Amendment) Regulations (Northern Ireland) 1998 (S.R. 1998 No. 76)
 Electrical Equipment for Explosive Atmospheres (Certification) (Amendment) Regulations (Northern Ireland) 1998 (S.R. 1998 No. 77)
 Employer's Liability (Compulsory Insurance) Exemption Regulations (Northern Ireland) 1998 (S.R. 1998 No. 78)
 Royal Ulster Constabulary Pensions (Provision of Information) Regulations 1998 (S.R. 1998 No. 79)
 Social Security (Miscellaneous Amendments No. 2) Regulations (Northern Ireland) 1998 (S.R. 1998 No. 81)
 Further Education (1997 Order) (Commencement) Order (Northern Ireland) 1998 (S.R. 1998 No. 82)
 Health Services (Proposals for Pilot Schemes) Regulations (Northern Ireland) 1998 (S.R. 1998 No. 83)
 Workmen's Compensation (Supplementation) (Amendment) Regulations (Northern Ireland) 1998 (S.R. 1998 No. 84)
 Occupational and Personal Pension Schemes (Levy and Register) (Amendments) Regulations (Northern Ireland) 1998 (S.R. 1998 No. 85)
 Optical Charges and Payments (Amendment) Regulations (Northern Ireland) 1998 (S.R. 1998 No. 86)
 Proceeds of Crime (Countries and Territories designated under the Criminal Justice Act 1988) Order (Northern Ireland) 1998 (S.R. 1998 No. 88)
 Legal Aid (Assessment of Resources) (Amendment) Regulations (Northern Ireland) 1998 (S.R. 1998 No. 89)
 Legal Advice and Assistance (Amendment) Regulations (Northern Ireland) 1998 (S.R. 1998 No. 90)
 Legal Advice and Assistance (Financial Conditions) Regulations (Northern Ireland) 1998 (S.R. 1998 No. 91)
 Legal Aid (Financial Conditions) Regulations (Northern Ireland) 1998 (S.R. 1998 No. 92)
 Dental Charges (Amendment) Regulations (Northern Ireland) 1998 (S.R. 1998 No. 93)
 Charges for Drugs and Appliances (Amendment) Regulations (Northern Ireland) 1998 (S.R. 1998 No. 94)
 Pharmaceutical Services (Amendment) Regulations (Northern Ireland) 1998 (S.R. 1998 No. 95)
 Further Education Teachers' (Eligibility) (Amendment) Regulations (Northern Ireland) 1998 (S.R. 1998 No. 96)

101-200

 Social Security (Contributions) (Amendment No. 2) Regulations (Northern Ireland) 1998 (S.R. 1998 No. 103)
 Race Relations (Complaints to Industrial Tribunals) (Armed Forces) Regulations (Northern Ireland) 1998 (S.R. 1998 No. 104)
 Equal Pay (Complaints to Industrial Tribunals) (Armed Forces) Regulations (Northern Ireland) 1998 (S.R. 1998 No. 105)
 Sex Discrimination (Complaints to Industrial Tribunals) (Armed Forces) Regulations (Northern Ireland) 1998 (S.R. 1998 No. 106)
 Potatoes Originating in Egypt Regulations (Northern Ireland) 1998 (S.R. 1998 No. 107)
 Animal By-Products (Amendment) Regulations (Northern Ireland) 1998 (S.R. 1998 No. 108)
 Social Security (Amendment) (Lone Parents) Regulations (Northern Ireland) 1998 (S.R. 1998 No. 112)
 Measuring Equipment (Liquid Fuel and Lubricants) Regulations (Northern Ireland) 1998 (S.R. 1998 No. 113)
 Housing Benefit (General) (Amendment No. 2) Regulations (Northern Ireland) 1998 (S.R. 1998 No. 114)
 School Admissions (Appeal Tribunals) Regulations (Northern Ireland) 1998 (S.R. 1998 No. 115)
 Motor Vehicles (Construction and Use) (Amendment) Regulations (Northern Ireland) 1998 (S.R. 1998 No. 116)
 Education (Amendment) Order (Northern Ireland) 1998 (S.R. 1998 No. 117)
 Curriculum (Programme of Study and Attainment targets in Irish in Irish Speaking Schools at Key Stages 3 and 4) Order (Northern Ireland) 1998 (S.R. 1998 No. 118)
 Education Reform (1989 Order) (Commencement No. 9) Order (Northern Ireland) 1998 (S.R. 1998 No. 119)
 Ulster Community and Hospitals Health and Social Services Trust (Establishment) Order (Northern Ireland) 1998 (S.R. 1998 No. 121)
 Ulster North Down and Ards Hospitals Health and Social Services Trust (Dissolution) Order (Northern Ireland) 1998 (S.R. 1998 No. 122)
 North Down and Ards Community Health and Social Services Trust (Dissolution) Order (Northern Ireland) 1998 (S.R. 1998 No. 123)
 Feeding Stuffs (Amendment) Regulations (Northern Ireland) 1998 (S.R. 1998 No. 124)
 Health and Safety (Fees) Regulations (Northern Ireland) 1998 (S.R. 1998 No. 125)
 New Deal (Miscellaneous Provisions) Order (Northern Ireland) 1998 (S.R. 1998 No. 127)
 Misuse of Druga (Amendment) Regulations (Northern Ireland) 1998 (S.R. 1998 No. 128)
 Misuse of Drugs (Designation) (Variation) Order (Northern Ireland) 1998 (S.R. 1998 No. 129)
 Employment Rights (Increase of Limits) Order (Northern Ireland) 1998 (S.R. 1998 No. 130)
 Carriage of Dangerous Goods by Rail Regulations (Northern Ireland) 1998 (S.R. 1998 No. 131)
 Packaging, Labelling and Carriage of Radioactive Material by Rail Regulations (Northern Ireland) 1998 (S.R. 1998 No. 132)
 Local Government (Superannuation) (Amendment) Regulations (Northern Ireland) 1998 (S.R. 1998 No. 133)
 Charges for Drugs and Appliances (Amendment No. 2) Regulations (Northern Ireland) 1998 (S.R. 1998 No. 135)
 Social Security (Minimum Contributions to Appropriate Personal Pension Schemes) Order (Northern Ireland) 1998 (S.R. 1998 No. 136)
 Social Security (Reduced Rates of Class 1 Contributions, and Rebates) (Money Purchase Contracted-out Schemes) Order (Northern Ireland) 1998 (S.R. 1998 No. 137)
 Health and Personal Social Services (Assessment of Resources) (Amendment) Regulations (Northern Ireland) 1998 (S.R. 1998 No. 138)
 Residential Care Homes (Amendment) Regulations (Northern Ireland) 1998 (S.R. 1998 No. 139)
 Nursing Homes (Amendment) Regulations (Northern Ireland) 1998 (S.R. 1998 No. 140)
 Level Crossing (Damhead North) Order (Northern Ireland) 1998 (S.R. 1998 No. 141)
 Level Crossing (Macfinn) Order (Northern Ireland) 1998 (S.R. 1998 No. 142)
 Level Crossing (Balnamore) Order (Northern Ireland) 1998 (S.R. 1998 No. 143)
 Level Crossing (Coldagh) Order (Northern Ireland) 1998 (S.R. 1998 No. 144)
 Plant Health (Amendment No. 2) Order (Northern Ireland) 1998 (S.R. 1998 No. 146)
 Planning (Control of Advertisements) (Amendment) Regulations (Northern Ireland) 1998 (S.R. 1998 No. 147)
 Ports (Levy on Disposals of Land, etc.) (Amendment) Order (Northern Ireland) 1998 (S.R. 1998 No. 148)
 Lands Tribunal (Salaries) Order (Northern Ireland) 1998 (S.R. 1998 No. 155)
 Street Works (Sharing of Costs of Works) Regulations (Northern Ireland) 1998 (S.R. 1998 No. 156)
 Bovine Hides Regulations (Northern Ireland) 1998 (S.R. 1998 No. 158)
 Nurses, Midwives and Health Visitors (Professional Conduct) (Amendment) Rules 1998, Approval Order (Northern Ireland) 1998 (S.R. 1998 No. 159)
 Bovines and Bovine Products (Trade) Regulations (Northern Ireland) 1998 (S.R. 1998 No. 163)
 Social Security Revaluation of Earnings Factors Order (Northern Ireland) 1998 (S.R. 1998 No. 164)
 Income Support (General) (Standard Interest Rate Amendment) Regulations (Northern Ireland) 1998 (S.R. 1998 No. 165)
 Litter (Fixed Penalty) Order (Northern Ireland) 1998 (S.R. 1998 No. 166)
 Social Security (Miscellaneous Amendments No. 3) Regulations (Northern Ireland) 1998 (S.R. 1998 No. 176)
 Departments (Transfer of Functions) (No. 2) Order (Northern Ireland) 1998 (S.R. 1998 No. 177)
 Lands Tribunal (Superannuation) (Amendment) Order (Northern Ireland) 1998 (S.R. 1998 No. 180)
 Salaries (Assembly Ombudsman and Commissioner for Complaints) Order (Northern Ireland) 1998 (S.R. 1998 No. 181)
 Social Security (Miscellaneous Amendments No. 4) Regulations (Northern Ireland) 1998 (S.R. 1998 No. 182)
 Disability Discrimination Act 1995 (Commencement No. 5) Order (Northern Ireland) 1998 (S.R. 1998 No. 183)
 Local Government (General Grant) Order (Northern Ireland) 1998 (S.R. 1998 No. 185)
 Fertilisers (Mammalian Meat and Bone Meal) Regulations (Northern Ireland) 1998 (S.R. 1998 No. 187)
 Fertilisers (Mammalian Meat and Bone Meal) (Conditions of Manufacture) Regulations (Northern Ireland) 1998 (S.R. 1998 No. 188)
 Bookmaking (Licensed Offices) (Amendment) Regulations (Northern Ireland) 1998 (S.R. 1998 No. 190)
 Bee Disease Control Order (Northern Ireland) 1998 (S.R. 1998 No. 191)
 Health Services (Pilot Schemes - Health Services Bodies) Regulations (Northern Ireland) 1998 (S.R. 1998 No. 192)
 Health Services (Pilot Schemes: Financial Assistance for Preparatory Work) Regulations (Northern Ireland) 1998 (S.R. 1998 No. 193)
 Horse Racing (Charges on Bookmakers) Order (Northern Ireland) 1998 (S.R. 1998 No. 194)
 Street Works (1995 Order) (Commencement No. 3) Order (Northern Ireland) 1998 (S.R. 1998 No. 196)
 Social Security (Amendment) (New Deal) Regulations (Northern Ireland) 1998 (S.R. 1998 No. 198)
 County Court (Amendment No. 2) Rules (Northern Ireland) 1998 (S.R. 1998 No. 199)
 Legal Aid in Criminal Proceedings (Costs) (Amendment) Rules (Northern Ireland) 1998 (S.R. 1998 No. 200)

201-300

 Proceeds of Crime (Northern Ireland) Order 1996 (Code of Practice) Order 1998 (S.R. 1998 No. 201)
 Welfare of Calves at Markets Regulations (Northern Ireland) 1998 (S.R. 1998 No. 202)
 Welfare of Animals and Poultry at Markets Order (Northern Ireland) 1998 (S.R. 1998 No. 203)
 Social Security (Student Amounts Amendment) Regulations (Northern Ireland) 1998 (S.R. 1998 No. 204)
 Education (Special Educational Needs Code of Practice) (Appointed Day) (Northern Ireland) Order 1998 (S.R. 1998 No. 205)
 Food Safety (Fishery Products and Live Shellfish) (Hygiene) Regulations (Northern Ireland) 1998 (S.R. 1998 No. 207)
 Occupational Pension Schemes (Contracting-out) (Amount Required for Restoring State Scheme Rights and Miscellaneous Amendment) Regulations (Northern Ireland) 1998 (S.R. 1998 No. 208)
 Apple and Pear Orchard Grubbing Up Regulations (Northern Ireland) 1998 (S.R. 1998 No. 209)
 Welfare Foods (Amendment) Regulations (Northern Ireland) 1998 (S.R. 1998 No. 210)
 Education (Special Educational Needs) (Amendment) Regulations (Northern Ireland) 1998 (S.R. 1998 No. 217)
 Larne Harbour Order (Northern Ireland) 1998 (S.R. 1998 No. 221)
 Planning (General Development) (Amendment) Order (Northern Ireland) 1998 (S.R. 1998 No. 222)
 Planning (Fees) (Amendment) Regulations (Northern Ireland) 1998 (S.R. 1998 No. 223)
 Motor Vehicles (Construction and Use) (Amendment No. 2) Regulations (Northern Ireland) 1998 (S.R. 1998 No. 225)
 Goods Vehicles (Testing) (Amendment No. 2) Regulations (Northern Ireland) 1998 (S.R. 1998 No. 226)
 Occupational Pension Schemes (Modification of the Pension Schemes (Northern Ireland) Act 1993) Regulations (Northern Ireland) 1998 (S.R. 1998 No. 227)
 Local Government (Competition in Functional Work) (Amendment) Regulations (Northern Ireland) 1998 (S.R. 1998 No. 228)
 Occupational Pension Schemes (Scheme Administration) (Amendment) Regulations (Northern Ireland) 1998 (S.R. 1998 No. 229)
 Disability Discrimination (Abolition of District Advisory Committees) Order (Northern Ireland) 1998 (S.R. 1998 No. 230)
 Sex Discrimination Code of Practice (Recruitment and Selection) (Appointed Day) Order (Northern Ireland) 1998 (S.R. 1998 No. 231)
 Social Security (Amendment) (Personal Allowances for Children) Regulations (Northern Ireland) 1998 (S.R. 1998 No. 232)
 Occupational Pension Schemes (Bank of England Act) (Consequential Amendments) Regulations (Northern Ireland) 1998 (S.R. 1998 No. 233)
 Royal Group of Hospitals and Dental Hospital Health and Social Services Trust (Establishment) (Amendment) Order (Northern Ireland) 1998 (S.R. 1998 No. 234)
 Police (Health and Safety) (Northern Ireland) Order 1997 (Commencement) Order 1998 (S.R. 1998 No. 235)
 Animals and Animal Products (Examination for Residues and Maximum Residue Limits) Regulations (Northern Ireland) 1998 (S.R. 1998 No. 237)
 Environmental Information (Amendment) Regulations (Northern Ireland) 1998 (S.R. 1998 No. 238)
 Child Benefit and Social Security (Fixing and Adjustment of Rates) (Amendment) Regulations (Northern Ireland) 1998 (S.R. 1998 No. 239)
 Royal Ulster Constabulary Pensions (Amendment) Regulations 1998 (S.R. 1998 No. 240)
 Social Security (Claims and Payments) (Amendment) Regulations (Northern Ireland) 1998 (S.R. 1998 No. 241)
 Suspension from Work on Maternity Grounds (Merchant Shipping and Fishing Vessels) Order (Northern Ireland) 1998 (S.R. 1998 No. 242)
 Fisheries and Aquaculture Structures (Grants) (Amendment) Regulations (Northern Ireland) 1998 (S.R. 1998 No. 243)
 General Dental Services (Amendment) Regulations (Northern Ireland) 1998 (S.R. 1998 No. 245)
 Social Security (Categorisation of Earners) (Amendment) Regulations (Northern Ireland) 1998 (S.R. 1998 No. 250)
 Welfare of Livestock (Amendment) Regulations (Northern Ireland) 1998 (S.R. 1998 No. 251)
 Housing Benefit (General) (Amendment No. 3) Regulations (Northern Ireland) 1998 (S.R. 1998 No. 252)
 Food Labelling (Amendment) Regulations (Northern Ireland) 1998 (S.R. 1998 No. 253)
 Schools (Suspension and Expulsion of Pupils) (Amendment) Regulations (Northern Ireland) 1998 (S.R. 1998 No. 255)
 Schools (Expulsion of Pupils) (Appeal Tribunals) (Amendment) Regulations (Northern Ireland) 1998 (S.R. 1998 No. 256)
 Industrial Training Levy (Construction Industry) Order (Northern Ireland) 1998 (S.R. 1998 No. 257)
 Criminal Justice (Children) (1998 Order) (Commencement No. 1) Order (Northern Ireland) 1998 (S.R. 1998 No. 260)
 Children (1995 Order) (Amendment) (Children's Services Planning) Order (Northern Ireland) 1998 (S.R. 1998 No. 261)
 Education (Student Loans) (Amendment) Regulations (Northern Ireland) 1998 (S.R. 1998 No. 262)
 Social Security (Guardian's Allowances) (Amendment) Regulations (Northern Ireland) 1998 (S.R. 1998 No. 263)
 Plastic Materials and Articles in Contact with Food Regulations (Northern Ireland) 1998 (S.R. 1998 No. 264)
 Pensions Appeal Tribunals (Northern Ireland) (Amendment) Rules 1998 (S.R. 1998 No. 265)
 Occupational Pension Schemes (Validation of Rule Alterations) Regulations (Northern Ireland) 1998 (S.R. 1998 No. 267)
 Industrial Pollution Control (Prescribed Processes and Substances) (Amendment) Regulations (Northern Ireland) 1998 (S.R. 1998 No. 268)
 Eggs (Marketing Standards) (Amendment) Regulations (Northern Ireland) 1998 (S.R. 1998 No. 269)
 Passenger and Goods Vehicles (Recording Equipment) Regulations (Northern Ireland) 1998 (S.R. 1998 No. 270)
 Salaries (Comptroller and Auditor General) Order (Northern Ireland) 1998 (S.R. 1998 No. 272)
 Students Awards Regulations (Northern Ireland) 1998 (S.R. 1998 No. 273)
 Employment Rights (Dispute Resolution) (1998 Order) (Commencement No. 1 and Transitional and Saving Provisions) Order (Northern Ireland) 1998 (S.R. 1998 No. 274)
 Social Fund Winter Fuel Payment (Amendment) Regulations (Northern Ireland) 1998 (S.R. 1998 No. 276)
 Superannuation (Commission for Racial Equality (Northern Ireland)) Order (Northern Ireland) 1998 (S.R. 1998 No. 278)
 Cattle Identification (No. 2) Regulations (Northern Ireland) 1998 (S.R. 1998 No. 279)
 Code of Practice (Picketing) (Appointed Day) Order (Northern Ireland) 1998 (S.R. 1998 No. 280)
 Control of Lead at Work Regulations (Northern Ireland) 1998 (S.R. 1998 No. 281)
 Local Government (Compensation for Premature Retirement) (Amendment) Regulations (Northern Ireland) 1998 (S.R. 1998 No. 286)
 Code of Practice (Redundancy Consultation and Procedures) (Appointed Day) Order (Northern Ireland) 1998 (S.R. 1998 No. 287)
 Waste and Contaminated Land (1997 Order) (Commencement No. 1) Order (Northern Ireland) 1998 (S.R. 1998 No. 288)
 Special Waste Regulations (Northern Ireland) 1998 (S.R. 1998 No. 289)
 Game Birds Preservation Order (Northern Ireland) 1998 (S.R. 1998 No. 290)
 Tuberculosis Control (Amendment) Order (Northern Ireland) 1998 (S.R. 1998 No. 293)
 Health Services (Pilot Schemes: Financial Assistance for Preparatory Work) (Amendment) Regulations (Northern Ireland) 1998 (S.R. 1998 No. 294)
 Road Traffic Regulation (1997 Order) (Commencement No. 2) Order (Northern Ireland) 1998 (S.R. 1998 No. 296)
 Disabled Persons (Badges for Motor Vehicles) (Amendment) Regulations (Northern Ireland) 1998 (S.R. 1998 No. 297)
 Education (Student Support) Regulations (Northern Ireland) 1998 (S.R. 1998 No. 298)
 Health and Personal Social Services (Superannuation) (Amendment) Regulations (Northern Ireland) 1998 (S.R. 1998 No. 299)
 Students Awards (Amendment) Regulations (Northern Ireland) 1998 (S.R. 1998 No. 300)

301-400

 Health Services (Primary Care) (1997 Order) (Commencement No. 2) Order (Northern Ireland) 1998 (S.R. 1998 No. 301)
 Education (Student Loans) (Amendment No. 2) Regulations (Northern Ireland) 1998 (S.R. 1998 No. 303)
 Green Park Health and Social Services Trust (Establishment) (Amendment) Order (Northern Ireland) 1998 (S.R. 1998 No. 304)
 Belfast City Hospital Health and Social Services Trust (Establishment) (Amendment) Order (Northern Ireland) 1998 (S.R. 1998 No. 305)
 Education (Student Support) (Northern Ireland) Order 1998 (Commencement and Transitional Provisions) Order (Northern Ireland) 1998 (S.R. 1998 No. 306)
 Education (Target-Setting in Schools) Regulations (Northern Ireland) 1998 (S.R. 1998 No. 307)
 Arable Area Payments (Amendment) Regulations (Northern Ireland) 1998 (S.R. 1998 No. 308)
 New Deal (Miscellaneous Provisions) (Amendment) Order (Northern Ireland) 1998 (S.R. 1998 No. 309)
 Fish Health Regulations (Northern Ireland) 1998 (S.R. 1998 No. 310)
 Social Security (1998 Order) (Commencement No. 1) Order (Northern Ireland) 1998 (S.R. 1998 No. 312)
 Plant Health (Amendment No. 3) Order (Northern Ireland) 1998 (S.R. 1998 No. 315)
 Pharmaceutical Services (Amendment No. 2) Regulations (Northern Ireland) 1998 (S.R. 1998 No. 316)
 Social Security (Contributions) (Amendment No. 3) Regulations (Northern Ireland) 1998 (S.R. 1998 No. 317)
 Trunk Roads (Designation of Routes) Order (Northern Ireland) 1998 (S.R. 1998 No. 318)
 Education and Libraries (Defined Activities) (Exemptions) (Amendment) Order (Northern Ireland) 1998 (S.R. 1998 No. 320)
 Education and Libraries (Competition in Functional Work) (Amendment) Regulations (Northern Ireland) 1998 (S.R. 1998 No. 321)
 Seeds (Fees) Regulations (Northern Ireland) 1998 (S.R. 1998 No. 322)
 Health and Personal Social Services (Fund-holding Practices) (Amendment) Regulations (Northern Ireland) 1998 (S.R. 1998 No. 323)
 Social Security (Welfare to Work) Regulations (Northern Ireland) 1998 (S.R. 1998 No. 324)
 Housing Benefit (Amendment) (New Deal) Regulations (Northern Ireland) 1998 (S.R. 1998 No. 325)
 Social Security (Amendment) (New Deal No. 2) Regulations (Northern Ireland) 1998 (S.R. 1998 No. 326)
 Social Security (Amendment) (Capital) Regulations (Northern Ireland) 1998 (S.R. 1998 No. 327)
 Smoke Control Areas (Sale or Delivery of Unauthorised Fuel) Regulations (Northern Ireland) 1998 (S.R. 1998 No. 328)
 Sulphur Content of Solid Fuel Regulations (Northern Ireland) 1998 (S.R. 1998 No. 329)
 Births, Deaths and Marriages (Fees) Order (Northern Ireland) 1998 (S.R. 1998 No. 330)
 Animals (Scientific Procedures) Act (Amendment to Schedule 2) Order (Northern Ireland) 1998 (S.R. 1998 No. 331)
 Social Security (Contributions) (Amendment No. 4) Regulations (Northern Ireland) 1998 (S.R. 1998 No. 332)
 Teachers Superannuation Regulations (Northern Ireland) 1998 (S.R. 1998 No. 333)
 Local Government (Superannuation) (Interchange) Regulations (Northern Ireland) 1998 (S.R. 1998 No. 337)
 Extraction Solvents in Food (Amendment) Regulations (Northern Ireland) 1998 (S.R. 1998 No. 345)
 Police (1998 Act) (Commencement No. 1) Order (Northern Ireland) 1998 (S.R. 1998 No. 346)
 Housing Benefit (Recovery of Overpayments) (Amendment) Regulations (Northern Ireland) 1998 (S.R. 1998 No. 348)
 Social Fund (Cold Weather Payments) (General) (Amendment) Regulations (Northern Ireland) 1998 (S.R. 1998 No. 351)
 Local Government (Defined Activities) (Exemptions) Order (Northern Ireland) 1998 (S.R. 1998 No. 352)
 Fertilisers (Amendment) Regulations (Northern Ireland) 1998 (S.R. 1998 No. 353)
 Pneumoconiosis, etc., (Workers' Compensation) (Payment of Claims) (Amendment) Regulations (Northern Ireland) 1998 (S.R. 1998 No. 358)
 Drinking Milk Regulations (Northern Ireland) 1998 (S.R. 1998 No. 359)
 Motor Vehicles (Type Approval) (Amendment) Regulations (Northern Ireland) 1998 (S.R. 1998 No. 363)
 Motor Vehicles (Use of Dynamic Axle Weighing Machines) Regulations (Northern Ireland) 1998 (S.R. 1998 No. 364)
 Diseases of Animals (Modification) Order (Northern Ireland) 1998 (S.R. 1998 No. 365)
 Sheep and Goats (Spongiform Encephalopathy) Order (Northern Ireland) 1998 (S.R. 1998 No. 366)
 Sheep and Goats (Spongiform Encephalopathy) Regulations (Northern Ireland) 1998 (S.R. 1998 No. 367)
 Countryside Access (Amendment) Regulations (Northern Ireland) 1998 (S.R. 1998 No. 368)
 National Minimum Wage (Employment Dismissal Procedures Agreements) (Repeal) Order (Northern Ireland) 1998 (S.R. 1998 No. 372)
 Feeding Stuffs (Amendment) (No. 2) Regulations (Northern Ireland) 1998 (S.R. 1998 No. 373)
 Weighing Equipment (Filling and Discontinuous Totalising Automatic Weighing Machines) (Amendment) Regulations (Northern Ireland) 1998 (S.R. 1998 No. 374)
 Mines (Safety of Exit) Regulations (Northern Ireland) 1998 (S.R. 1998 No. 375)
 Dentists Act 1984 (Amendment) Order (Northern Ireland) 1998 (S.R. 1998 No. 376)
 New Drivers (Appeals Procedure) Regulations (Northern Ireland) 1998 (S.R. 1998 No. 377)
 Road Traffic (New Drivers) (1998 Order) (Commencement) Order (Northern Ireland) 1998 (S.R. 1998 No. 378)
 Motor Vehicles (Driving Licences) (Amendment) Regulations (Northern Ireland) 1998 (S.R. 1998 No. 379)
 Motor Vehicles (Specified Restrictions) Regulations (Northern Ireland) 1998 (S.R. 1998 No. 380)
 Motor Vehicles (Speed Limit Restriction) (Exemption) Regulations (Northern Ireland) 1998 (S.R. 1998 No. 381)
 Olive Oil (Marketing Standards) (Amendment) Regulations (Northern Ireland) 1998 (S.R. 1998 No. 383)
 Spreadable Fats (Marketing Standards) (Amendment No. 2) Regulations (Northern Ireland) 1998 (S.R. 1998 No. 384)
 Working Time Regulations (Northern Ireland) 1998 (S.R. 1998 No. 386)
 Human Organ Transplants (Establishment of Relationship) Regulations (Northern Ireland) 1998 (S.R. 1998 No. 389)
 Waste and Contaminated Land (1997 Order) (Commencement No. 2) Order (Northern Ireland) 1998 (S.R. 1998 No. 390)
 Disability Discrimination (Exemption for Small Employers) Order (Northern Ireland) 1998 (S.R. 1998 No. 391)
 Identification and Movement of Sheep and Goats (Amendment) Order (Northern Ireland) 1998 (S.R. 1998 No. 393)
 Social Security (1998 Order) (Commencement No. 2) Order (Northern Ireland) 1998 (S.R. 1998 No. 395)
 Housing Renovation etc. Grants (Reduction of Grant) (Amendment) Regulations (Northern Ireland) 1998 (S.R. 1998 No. 396)
 Surface Waters (Dangerous Substances) (Classification) Regulations (Northern Ireland) 1998 (S.R. 1998 No. 397)
 Child Support (Miscellaneous Amendments No. 2) Regulations (Northern Ireland) 1998 (S.R. 1998 No. 400)

401-462

 Groundwater Regulations (Northern Ireland) 1998 (S.R. 1998 No. 401)
 Fisheries (Licence Duties) Byelaws (Northern Ireland) 1998 (S.R. 1998 No. 402)
 Eel Fishing (Licence Duties) Regulations (Northern Ireland) 1998 (S.R. 1998 No. 403)
 Health Services (Choice of Dental Practitioner) Regulations (Northern Ireland) 1998 (S.R. 1998 No. 404)
 Supreme Court Fees (Amendment) Order (Northern Ireland) 1998 (S.R. 1998 No. 406)
 Supreme Court (Non-Contentious Probate) Fees (Amendment) Order (Northern Ireland) 1998 (S.R. 1998 No. 407)
 Family Proceedings Fees (Amendment) Order (Northern Ireland) 1998 (S.R. 1998 No. 408)
 County Court Fees (Amendment) Order (Northern Ireland) 1998 (S.R. 1998 No. 409)
 Magistrates' Courts Fees (Amendment) Order (Northern Ireland) 1998 (S.R. 1998 No. 410)
 Judgment Enforcement Fees (Amendment) Order (Northern Ireland) 1998 (S.R. 1998 No. 411)
 Health Services (Choice of Medical Practitioner) Regulations (Northern Ireland) 1998 (S.R. 1998 No. 412)
 Health Services (Pilot Schemes: Part VI Practitioners) Regulations (Northern Ireland) 1998 (S.R. 1998 No. 413)
 Razor Shells (Prohibition of Fishing) Regulations (Northern Ireland) 1998 (S.R. 1998 No. 414)
 Motor Vehicles (Driving Licences) (Amendment No. 2) Regulations (Northern Ireland) 1998 (S.R. 1998 No. 415)
 Social Security (Contributions) (Amendment No. 5) Regulations (Northern Ireland) 1998 (S.R. 1998 No. 416)
 Income Support (General) (Standard Interest Rate Amendment No. 2) Regulations (Northern Ireland) 1998 (S.R. 1998 No. 417)
 Jobseeker's Allowance (Amendment) (New Deal) Regulations (Northern Ireland) 1998 (S.R. 1998 No. 418)
 Magistrates' Courts (Amendment) Rules (Northern Ireland) 1998 (S.R. 1998 No. 419)
 Occupational Pensions (Revaluation) Order (Northern Ireland) 1998 (S.R. 1998 No. 420)
 Social Security (New Deal Pilot) Regulations (Northern Ireland) 1998 (S.R. 1998 No. 421)
 Working Time (Amendment) Regulations (Northern Ireland) 1998 (S.R. 1998 No. 422)
 Fair Employment (Specification of Public Authorities) (Amendment) Order (Northern Ireland) 1998 (S.R. 1998 No. 424)
 Street Works (Reinstatement) Regulations (Northern Ireland) 1998 (S.R. 1998 No. 425)
 Appointment of Consultants (Special Agencies) Regulations (Northern Ireland) 1998 (S.R. 1998 No. 426)
 Mental Health (Nurses, Guardianship, Consent to Treatment and Prescribed Forms) (Amendment) Regulations (Northern Ireland) 1998 (S.R. 1998 No. 427)
 Social Security (Claims and Payments) (Amendment No. 2) Regulations (Northern Ireland) 1998 (S.R. 1998 No. 428)
 Environmental Assessment (Forestry) Regulations (Northern Ireland) 1998 (S.R. 1998 No. 437)
 Carriage of Dangerous Goods (Classification, Packaging and Labelling) and Use of Transportable Pressure Receptacles (Amendment) Regulations (Northern Ireland) 1998 (S.R. 1998 No. 438)
 Hill Livestock (Compensatory Allowances) (Amendment) Regulations (Northern Ireland) 1998 (S.R. 1998 No. 439)
 Sheep Annual Premium (Amendment) Regulations (Northern Ireland) 1998 (S.R. 1998 No. 440)
 Electricity (1992 Order) (Commencement No. 3) Order (Northern Ireland) 1998 (S.R. 1998 No. 441)
 Diseases of Animals (Modification) (No. 2) Order (Northern Ireland) 1998 (S.R. 1998 No. 442)
 Meters (Approval of Pattern or Construction and Manner of Installation) Regulations (Northern Ireland) 1998 (S.R. 1998 No. 443)
 Meters (Certification) Regulations (Northern Ireland) 1998 (S.R. 1998 No. 444)
 Drainage (Environmental Assessment) (Amendment) Regulations (Northern Ireland) 1998 (S.R. 1998 No. 446)
 Deseasonalisation Premium (Protection of Payments) (Amendment) Regulations (Northern Ireland) 1998 (S.R. 1998 No. 447)
 Carriage of Dangerous Goods (Amendment) Regulations (Northern Ireland) 1998 (S.R. 1998 No. 448)
 Pre-School Education in Schools (Admissions Criteria) Regulations (Northern Ireland) 1998 (S.R. 1998 No. 449)
 Education (School Information and Prospectuses) (Amendment) Regulations (Northern Ireland) 1998 (S.R. 1998 No. 451)
 Building (Amendment) Regulations (Northern Ireland) 1998 (S.R. 1998 No. 453)
 Housing Benefit (General) (Amendment No. 4) Regulations (Northern Ireland) 1998 (S.R. 1998 No. 455)
 Education (1998 Order) (Commencement No. 1) Order (Northern Ireland) 1998 (S.R. 1998 No. 456)
 Education (Assessment Arrangements for Key Stage 3) (Amendment) Order (Northern Ireland) 1998 (S.R. 1998 No. 457)
 Chemicals (Hazard Information and Packaging for Supply) (Amendment) Regulations (Northern Ireland) 1998 (S.R. 1998 No. 459)
 Education (Student Support) (Northern Ireland) Order 1998 (Commencement No. 2 and Transitional Provisions) Order (Northern Ireland) 1998 (S.R. 1998 No. 460)
 Proceeds of Crime (Countries and Territories designated under the Drug Trafficking Act 1994) (1997 Order) (Amendment) (Northern Ireland) Order 1998 (S.R. 1998 No. 461)
 Proceeds of Crime (Countries and Territories designated under the Criminal Justice Act 1988) (1998 Order) (Amendment) (Northern Ireland) Order 1998 (S.R. 1998 No. 462)

External links
  Statutory Rules (NI) List
 Draft Statutory Rules (NI) List

1998
Statutory rules
Northern Ireland Statutory Rules